Mapo District is one of the 25 districts of Seoul, South Korea.

Mapo has a population of 381,330 (2015) and has a geographic area of 23.87 km2 (9.22 sq mi), and is divided into 24 dong (administrative neighborhoods). Mapo is located in western Seoul on the northern bank of the Han River, bordering the Gyeonggi Province city of Goyang to the northwest, and the Seoul city districts of Gangseo to the west, Yeongdeungpo to the south, Yongsan to the southeast, Jung to the east, and Seodaemun and Eunpyeong to the north.

Mapo is home to several universities and government buildings, and is well known for the Hongdae club district around Hongik University.  Mapo is connected to the Seoul Metropolitan Subway's Line 2, Line 5, and Line 6, as well as the Airport Railroad, and the Korail Gyeongui-Jungang Line, which all pass through this district. The Seoul World Cup Stadium, a famous landmark in Seoul, is located in Sangam in northwest Mapo.

Mapo District Office

Location
Mapo District Office is located in Seongsan-2 precinct, near World Cup Stadium (5 minutes on foot).

Organization
The district office has 5 Bureaus, 1 Community Health Center, 36 Divisions, 1 Room, 1 Task Force Team, 16 Community Service Centers. Mapo District Office employs about 1,300 personnels. The entire office is headed by Administrator. Current Administrator is Hong-seop Park (2017).

Administrative divisions

Mapo District was formed in 1944 from portions of Seodaemun and Yongsan Districts.  The dong (동) structure was revised in 1985 and 2008. Roughly 53% of Mapo District's area is taken up by residences, many of which are high-rise apartment buildings.  Much of the remaining area (43%) is greenspace, including the World Cup Park and additional parkland along the Han River.

In the 2008 revamping of the precinct (dong) administration, some smaller precincts were merged to form larger precincts, effectively reducing the number of precinct administrative offices. As a result, the number of precinct offices decreased to 16 from 24. However, addresses remained the same.

These are the revamped administrative precincts:

Origin of the name
The name "Mapo" comes from the name of an old ferry across the Han River, and can roughly be translated as "hemp ferry."

Education
Four college or university institutions, including Sogang University and Hongik University, are located within Mapo District. The area around Hongik University, also known as Hongdae, is well known as one of the cultural centers of Seoul, and was named one of the coolest neighborhoods in the world in 2016. There are eight high schools, including Seoul Girls' High School, along with 12 middle schools and 20 elementary schools serving the community. There are three special schools for disabled or industrial educations. Due to the presence of university students in the district, Mapo District offers a large variety of shopping and dining options.

International schools:
Japanese School in Seoul in Sangam-dong

Sister cities
 Shijingshan, China

References

External links

Mapo-gu government website 

 
Districts of Seoul